JSCA International Stadium Complex  formally known as  (Jharkhand State Cricket Association International Cricket Stadium), and also known as Jharkhand State Cricket Association Stadium, is an international cricket stadium in Ranchi, Jharkhand. It is the home ground of the Jharkhand cricket team.

This stadium has organised 2 matches of IPL so far .  It was inaugurated in January 2013.  The first ODI match was played on 19 January 2013 between India and England.

History

The JSCA's decision to build a new cricket stadium in Ranchi stemmed from a dispute with Tata Steel, regarding allocations of international matches and conducting matches in Keenan Stadium.

This conflict came about when an international match between India and England was moved to Bangalore, with the JSCA stating they did not receive any response from Tata Steel. Following this, the JSCA decided a new stadium was needed.
JSCA Stadium Constructed by M/s Ram Kripal Singh Construction Private Limited, Ranchi, Jharkhand.
As Jharkhand State Cricket Association is a full member of the Board of Control for Cricket in India (BCCI), it organises international matches in the state, but JSCA did not own any international cricket stadiums, the only one being Keenan Stadium, Jamshedpur which was owned by Tata Steel. Therefore, it was decided to construct its own International Cricket Stadium in Ranchi, the capital of Jharkhand.
 
The design commission was given to architectural consultants Kothari Associates Pvt. Ltd. of Delhi.

This stadium is built within the premises of HEC (Heavy Engineering Corporation), a public sector company. This stadium is the home ground of Indian Cricket Team's former skipper Mahendra Singh Dhoni.

The stadium has been constructed in such a way that no shadow falls on any of the nine pitches before 4.45 pm, even on the shortest day of the year. There is another ground in the complex which has five pitches.

There is a practice arena with eight pitches. The stadium has a seating capacity of around 50,000 and 76 corporate boxes. Spectators can also enjoy views from two nearby hills on the East and West Sides called the East and West Hills. This is the only stadium in the country having hills on both sides.

The two pavilions, North and South, are fully air-conditioned have five levels each which include VIP areas, members' enclosure, donors' enclosure, president's box, the BCCI box and two large dressing rooms with separate dining spaces for players.

Membrane roofs provide shade from the sun. The Stadium also features an Indoor Cricket centre consisting of three indoor pitches, with a residential complex where players can stay for training.

In November 2015, the stadium was selected one of the six new Test venue along with Maharashtra Cricket Association Stadium, Holkar Stadium, Saurashtra Cricket Association Stadium, Himachal Pradesh Cricket Association Stadium and Dr. Y.S. Rajasekhara Reddy ACA-VDCA Cricket Stadium in India.

Project details

 Cost:  to build
 Area: 130,000m2
 Capacity: 39,000

The stadium hosted its 1st ODI match on 19 Jan 2013 between India and England.

Earlier JSCA was hoping to get an International Match during West Indies/England's tour of India (2011). The stadium is built within the city limits of "Ranchi". It is only 10-minute drive from the Ranchi airport "Birsa Munda Airport" and 25 minutes from a five-star hotel "Hotel Radisson Blu". It is well connected by a four-lane road. It is also well connected to Ranchi junction and Hatia railway stations.

The JSCA Cricket Stadium project includes: 
 A main 9 wicket match ground
 Adjacent practice ground with nets, for practice and smaller matches
 Practice Arena of 8 pitches
 Spectator capacity for 39,000
 A Members' Pavilion and a media stand(250)
 Additional facilities for members including tennis and basketball courts, a swimming pool and spa
 76 corporate hospitality boxes
 An indoor Cricket Academy with residential accommodation for youth training schemes
 35 suites for guests

List of Centuries

Key
 * denotes that the batsman was not out.
 Inns. denotes the number of the innings in the match.
 Balls denotes the number of balls faced in an innings.
 NR denotes that the number of balls was not recorded.
 Parentheses next to the player's score denotes his century number at Edgbaston.
 The column title Date refers to the date the match started.
 The column title Result refers to the player's team result

Test Centuries

One Day Internationals

|
|The bowler was man of the match
|-
|
|10 or more wickets taken in the match
|-
|§
|One of two five-wicket hauls by the bowler in the match
|-
|Date
|Day the Test started or ODI was held
|-
|Inn
|Innings in which five-wicket haul was taken
|-
|Overs
|Number of overs bowled.
|-
|Runs
|Number of runs conceded
|-
|Wkts
|Number of wickets taken
|-
|Econ
|Runs conceded per over
|-
|Batsmen
|Batsmen whose wickets were taken
|-
|Drawn
|The match was drawn.
|}

Tests

References

External links
 JSCA: Jharkhand State Cricket Association
 JSCA International Cricket Stadium at Cricinfo
 JSCA International Cricket Stadium at cricketarchive
 JSCA International Cricket Stadium at Yahoo

Cricket grounds in Jharkhand
Sports venues in Jharkhand
Buildings and structures in Ranchi
Sport in Ranchi
Sports venues in Ranchi
Test cricket grounds in India
Sports venues completed in 2011
2011 establishments in Jharkhand